Kirk MacDonald  may refer to:

 Kirk MacDonald (ice hockey) (born 1983), Canadian ice hockey player
 Kirk MacDonald (politician), member of the Legislative Assembly of New Brunswick
 Kirk MacDonald (musician), jazz musician